Jermaine Christopher Darlington (born 11 April 1974) is an English former professional footballer and current manager. He was most recently joint manager of Faversham Town.

Career

Playing career
Darlington began his career as a trainee at Charlton Athletic, where he played two first-team games near the end of the 1991–92 season. He was released a year later and dropped out of the professional game, continuing his career on a semi-professional basis, playing with Dover Athletic, Hendon and Aylesbury United.

He got a second chance in the Football League in 1999, when he was signed by Queens Park Rangers from non-League club Aylesbury United, for £25,000.

Darlington went on to make over 80 professional appearances for the R's before then First Division side Wimbledon bought him for £200,000 in 2001. He made over 100 appearances for The Dons, before being released at the end of the 2003–04 season.

Brief stints at Watford and Cardiff City followed in 2004–05, and 2005–06 however with a knee injury restricting his first-team chances Darlington left Cardiff in the summer of 2006, effectively retiring from professional football.

Following a trial with AFC Wimbledon, Darlington agreed terms with the Dons in time for the game against Tonbridge Angels on 18 November 2006, making him the first ex-Wimbledon player to play competitively for AFC Wimbledon.

This move would prove costly for the Dons however as, due to an administrative error by the club in signing him, Darlington was initially ineligible to play for the club. The penalties the club received for this mistake were severe. The Dons were expelled from two cup competitions, the Surrey Senior Cup and the FA Trophy, for which the club was ordered to repay £12,000 in prize money, and also received a hefty penalty in the Isthmian League with 18 league points being docked, in addition to a £400 fine & costs. This 18-point penalty was later reduced to just three points, after an appeal to The FA. Darlington was released at the end of the 2006–07 season by new Dons boss Terry Brown.

After his release from AFC Wimbledon Darlington did not find another semi pro club, instead opting to play local football in London. However, in October 2009 and at the age of 35 he made the move back to the semi pro game, signing for Isthmian League Premier Division side Maidstone United.

Darlington subsequently joined Isthmian League Division One South side Whitstable Town in March 2011, providing much needed cover and experience. Manager Peter Nott was quoted on the capture of Darlington: "As you can see Jermaine brings a wealth of experience with him and I am confident he will settle in very quickly". He made his Natives debut on 15 March 2011 in a home loss to Whyteleafe. He retired from playing after leaving Whitstable.

Coaching and management
After retiring from football, Darlington became joint manager of Sittingbourne U21s alongside John Embery in 2015. In May 2017 the pair were appointed joint managers of Herne Bay. He resigned on 31 March 2019.

In June 2022, Darlington was appointed joint manager of Faversham Town, again with John Embery. Following a poor start to the season, the duo left the club on 17 October 2022.

Notes

References

External links

1974 births
Living people
Footballers from Hackney Central
English footballers
Charlton Athletic F.C. players
Dover Athletic F.C. players
Hendon F.C. players
Aylesbury United F.C. players
Queens Park Rangers F.C. players
Wimbledon F.C. players
Watford F.C. players
Cardiff City F.C. players
AFC Wimbledon players
Maidstone United F.C. players
Whitstable Town F.C. players
Sittingbourne F.C. managers
English Football League players
Black British sportspeople
Association football midfielders
Association football defenders
English football managers
Herne Bay F.C. managers
Faversham Town F.C. managers
Isthmian League managers